Havasu 95 Speedway is a  paved oval racing circuit located in Lake Havasu City, Arizona.

The track primarily hosts weekly stock car events. Classes that run at the track include late models, modifieds, trucks, street stocks, legends, bandoleros, and factory stocks. It is one of 3 paved ovals in the state of Arizona, and the only one in western Arizona.

The track hosted its first NASCAR touring series event, a K&N Pro Series West race, in 2012. It held a Lucas Oil Modified Series race in 2015.

References

External links 
 

Buildings and structures in Mohave County, Arizona
Motorsport venues in Arizona
Tourist attractions in Mohave County, Arizona
Lake Havasu City, Arizona